Oberelsbach is a municipality in the district of Rhön-Grabfeld in Bavaria in Germany.

References

Rhön-Grabfeld